Blood Clot Boy is a figure in the mythologies of several Native American tribes, including the Cree, Blackfoot, Pawnee, and Arapaho. He is depicted as being born from a clot of blood.

References

Algonquian mythology
Arapaho
Blackfoot culture
Cree culture
Pawnee